L'Arroseur Arrosé (also known as The Waterer Watered  and The Sprinkler Sprinkled) is an 1895 French short black-and-white silent comedy film directed and produced by Louis Lumière and starring François Clerc and Benoît Duval. It was first screened on June 10, 1895.

It is the earliest known instance of film comedy, the first use of film to portray a fictional story, and the first use of a promotional film poster. The film was originally known as Le Jardinier ("The Gardener") or Le Jardinier et le petit espiègle, and is sometimes referred to in English as The Tables Turned on the Gardener, and The Sprinkler Sprinkled.

Plot

Shot in Lyon in the spring of 1895, the film portrays a simple practical joke in which a gardener is tormented by a boy who steps on the hose that the gardener is using to water his plants, cutting off the water flow. When the gardener tilts the nozzle up to inspect it, the boy releases the hose, causing the water to spray him. The gardener is stunned and his hat is knocked off, but he soon catches on. A chase ensues, both on and off-screen (the camera never moves from its original position) until the gardener catches the boy and administers a spanking. The entire film lasts only 45 seconds, but this simple bit of slapstick may be the forerunner of all subsequent film comedy.  The 1896 film version replaces the boy with a teenager and the spanking action is substituted with a kick in the rump.

Production
In the earliest years of the history of film, the cinema was used by pioneers such as Thomas Edison and the Lumières to entertain by the sheer novelty of the invention, and most films were short recordings of mundane events, such as a sneeze, or the arrival of a train. The Lumières took some of the first steps toward narrative film with L'Arroseur arrosé. Given the documentary nature of existing films up until this point, a scripted, comedic film shown among these was unexpected by an audience, enhancing its comedic surprise value.

It was filmed by means of the Cinématographe, an all-in-one camera, which also serves as a film projector and developer. As with all early Lumière movies, this film was made in a 35 mm format with an aspect ratio of 1.33:1.

Cast
Louis Lumière used his own gardener, François Clerc, to portray the gardener. For the mischievous boy, Lumière used a young apprentice carpenter from the Lumière factory who is variously credited as Daniel Duval and Benoît Duval (born 1881). But Léon Trotobas seems to have been the first boy to play the role in La Ciotat.

 François Clerc as Gardener
 Léon Trotobas, then Benoît Duval as Boy (sometimes credited as Daniel Duval)

Poster
The poster for L'Arroseur arrosé has the distinction of being the first poster designed to promote an individual film. Although posters had been used to advertise cinematic projection shows since 1890, early posters were typically devoted to describing the quality of the recordings and touting the technological novelty of these shows. The poster for L'Arroseur, illustrated by Marcellin Auzolle, depicts an audience (in the foreground) laughing as the film (in the background) is projected against a screen. It depicts the moment the gardener is splashed in the face, and is thus also the first film poster to depict an actual scene from a film.

Copies and imitations
As copyright law was neither enforced nor yet well-defined for the emerging art of cinema, it was common both for competing filmmakers to reshoot a popular film short and for distributors to duplicate a film print to show as their own. Through these practices, L'Arroseur Arrosé was copied several times and released under a number of different titles in both France and the United States, including at least one remake by the Lumières themselves. Little is known about most of these copies, although one remake was filmed by Georges Méliès, titled L'Arroseur, in 1896. In Britain, The Biter Bit was released in 1899. French New Wave director François Truffaut later included an homage to the gag in his 1958 film, Les Mistons.

Current status
Given its age, this short film is available to freely download from the Internet. It has also featured in a number of film collections including Landmarks of Early Film Volume 1.

See also

Anarchic comedy film
Visual gag

References

External links
Complete 1895 film on YouTube. 
Complete 1896 film on YouTube
The Lumiere Institute, Lyon, France
 

1895 films
French silent short films
1895 comedy films
Films directed by Auguste and Louis Lumière
French comedy films
French black-and-white films
1895 short films
Silent comedy films